William McPetrie (15 February 1880 – 30 June 1951) was an Australian cricketer. He played two first-class cricket matches for Victoria in 1905.

See also
 List of Victoria first-class cricketers

References

External links
 

1880 births
1951 deaths
Australian cricketers
Victoria cricketers
Cricketers from Melbourne